Reginald Moore (1910–1968) was an English cathedral organist, who served in Exeter Cathedral.

Background
Reginald Moore was born in Bramley, Leeds. He was a pupil of Sir Edward Bairstow and held several appointments as organist in and around Leeds before becoming assistant at Salisbury Cathedral in 1933. During the Second World War he served in the Royal Air Force. From 1947 to 1952 he was assistant music master at Winchester College.  There were a number of BBC broadcasts of his organ recitals during his tenure at Exeter.
In May 2010, Exeter Cathedral held a celebration Evensong marking the centenary of his birth, singing psalm chants and descants written by him.

Career
Assistant Organist of:
Salisbury Cathedral (1933–1947)

Organist of:
Exeter Cathedral (1953–1957)

References

1910 births
1968 deaths
English classical organists
British male organists
Cathedral organists
20th-century classical musicians
20th-century English musicians
20th-century organists
20th-century British male musicians
Male classical organists